Of Course You Are is the twenty-second studio album by singer-songwriter Robert Pollard. It was released March 4, 2016, on Fire Records. The album was produced by Ricked Wicky member Nick Mitchell.

Track listing 

 "My Daughter Yes She Knows"
 "Long Live Instant Pandemonium"
 "Come And Listen"
 "Little Pigs"
 "Promo Brunette"
 "I Can Illustrate"
 "The Hand That Holds You"
 "Collision Daycare"
 "That's The Way You Gave It To Me"
 "Contemporary Man (He Is Our Age)"
 "Losing It"
 "Of Course You Are"

References

2016 albums
Robert Pollard albums
Fire Records (UK) albums